Community of common destiny for mankind, officially translated as community with a shared future for mankind or human community with a shared future, is a political slogan used by the Chinese Communist Party (CCP) to describe a stated foreign-policy goal of the People's Republic of China. The phrase was first used by former CCP General Secretary Hu Jintao and has been frequently cited by current General Secretary Xi Jinping. As the term's usage in English has increased, "shared future" has become more frequently used than "common destiny," as the latter arguably implies a predetermined path. The phrase was included in the CCP Constitution in 1997, and the preamble of the Constitution of the People's Republic of China when the Constitution was amended in 2018.

Usage by the CCP

The CCP has used this slogan to express its aim of creating a “new framework” of international relations which would promote and improve global governance. Some Chinese analysts have hailed the expression as the first major amendment of China's foreign policy in more than four decades, shifting from being nation-oriented to focusing on the whole of humankind.

Chinese government officials have sought international recognition for the slogan and have argued that China will adhere to a peaceful development policy and has no intention to change the international order. Government officials, especially diplomats, use the phrase to create a sense of a mission that is beneficial to other countries and not just China itself.

Examples 
The phrase “community of common destiny” first appeared in a report delivered by former CCP General Secretary Hu Jintao to the 17th National Congress of the Chinese Communist Party in 2007, referring to shared blood and common destiny of mainland China and Taiwan. In his 2012 report to the 18th National Congress, Hu broadened the expression by adding “for all mankind” to emphasize that "mankind has only one earth to live on, and countries have only one world to share" and called for the building of a “harmonious world of enduring peace and common prosperity.” Hu envisioned a new type of more equitable and balanced global development partnership that would stick together in times of difficulty, both sharing rights and shouldering obligations, and boosting the common interests of mankind.

When Xi Jinping met with foreigners for the first time after taking office as General Secretary of the CCP (paramount leader) in November 2012, he said that the international community has increasingly become a community with shared future, with each having a stake in others.

Xi used the slogan in an international arena at the Moscow State Institute of International Relations in March 2013, and again in a speech to the World Economic Forum in Davos, Switzerland in January 2017, which "won him high credits at home and abroad".

Beginning in 2017, Chinese diplomats at the United Nations sought to have the phrase inserted into several UN General Assembly resolutions. Several other countries, including India and the United States, resisted this language, calling it inappropriate for multilateral resolutions to include the “political ideology” of one country.

International opposition led to the removal of the catchphrase from most of the draft resolutions, but it survived in two 2017 resolutions authored by the Chinese delegation: one on "no first placement of weapons in outer space", aimed at preventing an arms race in outer space, and a second on "further practical measures for the prevention of an arms race in outer space." Chinese officials subsequently cited the two UN resolutions in “an attempt to demonstrate that the concept has been broadly accepted by the international community.” However, when similar resolutions were approved in the 2018 session of the General Assembly, the controversial language was removed. Delegations from multiple countries subsequently banded together to oppose Chinese efforts to include the phrase in other multilateral documents.

On March 11, 2018, the constitutional amendment adopted at the first meeting of the 13th National People's Congress of China added a sentence that promoted the building of a community with a shared future while developing diplomatic relations and economic and cultural exchanges with other countries.

In August 2018, China's top diplomat, Yang Jiechi, wrote that “Building a community of common destiny for mankind is the overall goal of China's foreign affairs work in the new era” and requires a “new type of international relations.”

Chinese Foreign Minister Wang Yi used the phrase at the 2020 Munich Security Conference.

Chinese state media has also cited the collective effort across the globe to address the COVID-19 pandemic.

Usage by the United Nations 
As a result of sustained Chinese government's efforts, in 2017 the phrase was incorporated by the United Nations into the resolution on the UN Commission for Social Development. It has also been used by the UN Disarmament Commission, the Human Rights Council, and the UN General Assembly First Commission.

Interpretations 
Analysts outside of China have expressed concern that the CCP's vision of a “community of common destiny” represents “an attack on the multilateral order of international organizations, alliances and shared sovereignty that has attempted to manage the world since 1945.” Some have argued that Xi's community of common destiny for mankind would replace the established international order, grounded in free and sovereign nation-states that abide by commonly accepted international laws, with a unity of nations whose economic dependence on China leads them to defer to Chinese political demands.

See also 
 Ideology of the Chinese Communist Party
 Beijing Consensus

References

Further reading 

 
 
 
 
 
 

Xi Jinping
Ideology of the Chinese Communist Party
Constitution of China
People's Republic of China diplomacy
Slogans